The Indian Journal of Palliative Care is a peer-reviewed open-access medical journal published on behalf of the Indian Association of Palliative Care. The journal publishes articles on the subject of palliative and supportive care including palliative nursing.

Abstracting and indexing 
The journal is indexed in EBSCO databases, EMCare, Expanded Academic ASAP, PubMed, and Scopus.

External links 
 

Open access journals
English-language journals
Triannual journals
Publications established in 1995
Medknow Publications academic journals
Anesthesiology and palliative medicine journals
Academic journals associated with learned and professional societies of India